Gran Via may refer to:

 Gran Vía, street in Murcia; la millor del mon
 Estación de Gran Vía, metro station in Madrid
 Gran Vía de Colón, street in Granada;
 Gran Vía, street in Madrid;
 Gran Vía, street in Zaragoza;
 Gran Vía de Don Diego López de Haro, street in Bilbao;
 Gran Via de les Corts Catalanes, known as Gran Via, street in Barcelona;
 Granvia l'Hospitalet, a major business district of Barcelona;
 Gran Via Productions, a film production company founded by producer Mark Johnson.
La Gran Vía may also refer to:
 La Gran Vía, a Spanish Zarzuela
 Lifestyle Center La Gran Via, a shopping mall